WQED-FM (89.3 MHz) is a non-commercial, public radio station licensed to serve Pittsburgh, Pennsylvania. The station is owned by WQED Multimedia, and broadcasts a classical format. It is a sister station to the Pittsburgh area's PBS member station, WQED (TV). WQED-FM is a member station of National Public Radio and an affiliate of Public Radio International.

WQED-FM annually produces a 26-week series of Pittsburgh Symphony broadcasts for distribution via Public Radio International.

WQED-FM uses HD Radio, and broadcasts archived concert performances by local performance groups on its HD2 subchannel.

WQED-FM is Local Primary Emergency Alert System Station 2 for the Pittsburgh Extended area.

History
The station began broadcasting on January 25, 1973 and began using HD Radio in January, 2006. HD2 programming began in 2012.

Simulcast
One full power station simulcasts the programming of WQED-FM:

References

External links 

QED-FM
NPR member stations
Classical music radio stations in the United States
Radio stations established in 1973
1973 establishments in Pennsylvania